The mammals of Australia have a rich fossil history, as well as a variety of extant mammalian species, dominated by the marsupials, but also including monotremes and placentals. The marsupials evolved to fill specific ecological niches, and in many cases they are physically similar to the placental mammals in Eurasia and North America that occupy similar niches, a phenomenon known as convergent evolution.  For example, the top mammalian predators in Australia, the Tasmanian tiger and the marsupial lion, bore a striking resemblance to large canids such as the gray wolf and large cats respectively; gliding possums and flying squirrels have similar adaptations enabling their arboreal lifestyle; and the numbat and anteaters are both digging insectivores. Most of Australia's mammals are herbivores or omnivores.

Evolutionary history
The fossil record shows that monotremes have been present in Australia since the Early Cretaceous .

Marsupials probably existed in Australia at least from the early Paleocene, although the earliest found undoubted fossils of Australian marsupials are from the late Oligocene .

The indisputable remains of Australian placental mammals started from the Miocene, when Australia moved closer to Indonesia. After  bats appeared reliably in the fossil record, and after  rodents did.

Some claims were made about placental mammal fossils from the Eocene of Australia, called Tingamarra. These claims are based on only one found tooth having some characteristic features of condylarth, and were discussed widely. But both the age and placental nature of these fossils were challenged by other researchers.

Monotremes and marsupials
Monotremes are mammals with a unique method of reproduction: they lay eggs instead of giving birth to live young. Two of the five known living species of monotreme occur in Australia: the platypus and the short-beaked echidna. The platypus — a venomous, egg-laying, duck-billed, amphibious mammal — is one of the strangest creatures in the animal kingdom. When a platypus pelt was first presented by Joseph Banks to English naturalists in the late 18th century, they were convinced it must be a cleverly created hoax.  Another strange monotreme is the short-beaked echidna; covered in hairy spikes, with a tubular snout in the place of a mouth, it has a tongue that can move in and out of the snout about 100 times per minute to capture termites.

Australia is also home to the world's largest and most diverse selection of marsupials: mammals with a pouch in which they rear their young. The marsupial carnivores — order Dasyuromorphia — are represented by two surviving families: the Dasyuridae with 51 members, and the Myrmecobiidae with the numbat as its sole surviving member.

The thylacine, or Tasmanian tiger, was the largest Dasyuromorphia and the last living specimen of the family Thylacinidae; however, the last known specimen died in captivity in 1936. The world's largest surviving carnivorous marsupial is the Tasmanian devil; it is the size of a small dog and hunts although it is opportunistic. It became extinct on the mainland some 600 years ago and is now found only in Tasmania. There are four species of quoll, or native cat, all of which are threatened species. There are two species of marsupial mole — order Notoryctemorphia — that inhabit the deserts of Western Australia. These rare, blind, earless carnivores spend most of their time underground; little is known about them.

The marsupial omnivores include the bandicoots and bilbies, order Peramelemorphia. There are seven species in Australia, most of which are endangered. These small creatures share several characteristic physical features: a plump, arch-backed body with a long, delicately tapering snout, large upright ears, long thin legs, and a thin tail. The evolutionary origin of this group is unclear, but they share characteristics from both carnivorous and herbivorous marsupials.

The marsupial herbivores are classified in the order Diprotodontia, and further into the suborders Vombatiformes, Phalangeriformes and Macropodiformes. The Vombatiformes include the koala and the three species of wombat. One of Australia's best-known marsupials, the koala is an arboreal (tree-dwelling) species that feeds on the leaves of some 120 species of eucalyptus. Wombats, on the other hand, live on the ground and feed on grasses, sedges and roots. Wombats use their rodent-like front teeth and powerful claws to dig extensive burrow systems; they are mainly crepuscular and nocturnal. Wombats are also well known for their backwards facing pouches. Also among this group is the marsupial lion, which went extinct after the arrival of aboriginals, and was one of the few carnivorous vombatiforms. 

The Phalangeriformes includes possums and is a diverse group of arboreal marsupials, including six families and 26 species. They vary in size from the pygmy possum, weighing just , to the cat-sized common ringtail and brushtail possums. The sugar and squirrel gliders are common species of gliding possum, found in the eucalyptus forests of eastern Australia, while the feathertail glider is the smallest glider species. The gliding possums have membranes, called "patagia", that extend from the fifth finger of their forelimb back to the first toe of their hind foot. These membranes, when outstretched, allow them to glide between trees. 

The Macropodiformes are divided into three families that are found in all Australian environments except alpine areas: the Hypsiprymnodontidae, with the musky rat-kangaroo as its only member; the Potoroidae, with 10 species; and the Macropodidae which had 53 members in Australia, but some species are extinct. The Potoroidae include the bettongs, potaroos and rat-kangaroos, small species that make nests and carry plant material with their tails. The Macropodiae include kangaroos, wallabies and associated species; size varies widely within this family. Most macropods move in a bipedal, energy-efficient hopping motion. They have powerfully muscled tails and large hind legs with long narrow hind feet. The hind feet have a distinctive arrangement of four toes, while the short front legs have five separate digits.

Placental mammals

Australia has indigenous placental mammals from two orders: the bats, order Chiroptera,  represented by six families, and the mice and rats, order Rodentia, family Muridae. Bats and rodents are relatively recent arrivals to Australia. Although 7% of the world's bats species live in Australia, there are only two endemic genera of bats. Rodents first arrived in Australia  and underwent a wide radiation to produce the species collectively known as the "old endemics". The old endemics are represented by 14 extant genera. About a million years ago, the rat entered Australia from New Guinea and evolved into seven species of Rattus, collectively called the "new endemics".

Since human settlement, many placental mammals have been introduced to Australia and are now feral. The first was the dingo; fossil evidence suggests that people from the north brought the dingo to Australia about  years ago. When Europeans settled Australia they intentionally released many species into the wild, including the red fox, brown hare, and the European rabbit. Other domestic species have escaped and over time have produced wild populations, including the cat, fallow deer, rusa deer, chital, domestic horse, donkey, pig, domestic goat, water buffalo, and dromedary. Only three species of Australia's non-indigenous placental mammals were not deliberately introduced: the house mouse, black rat and brown rat.      

                                                 
                    
Forty-six marine mammals from the order Cetacea are found in Australian coastal waters, but since many of these species have a global distribution, some authors do not consider them Australian species. There are nine species of baleen whale, including the enormous humpback whales and southern right whales. Dwarf minke whales are common off Great Barrier Reef in winter. There are 37 species of toothed whale, which include all six genera of the family Ziphiidae (beaked whales), and 21 species of oceanic dolphin, including the Australian snubfin dolphin, a species first described in 2005 that is endemic to Australia. Some oceanic dolphins, such as the orca, can be found in all waters around the continent; others, such as the Irrawaddy dolphin, are confined to the warm northern waters. The dugong (order Sirenia) is an endangered marine species that inhabits the waters of northeastern and northwestern Australia, particularly the Torres Strait. The dugong is the only herbivorous marine mammal in Australia, feeding on sea grass in coastal areas. 

Ten species of seals and sea lions (parvorder Pinnipedia) live off the southern Australian coast and in Sub-Antarctic Australian territories.

See also
Mammals
List of Australian mammals
List of Australian monotremes and marsupials
List of Australian bats
List of Australian rodents
List of placental mammals introduced to Australia
List of Australian marine mammals

Other
Australian megafauna, from first human colonisation to 1788
Amphibians of Australia
Birds of Australia
Freshwater fish of Australia
List of extinct animals of Australia
Threatened fauna of Australia

References